Olavi Oskari Ala-Nissilä (born August 2, 1949 in Loimaa kunta, Finland) is a Finnish politician. He has been an MP from 1991 to 2006 and was re-elected in 2015. Ala-Nissilä was a member of the European Court of Auditors in between 2006 and 2012.

Ala-Nissilä graduated in 1967, graduated as a graduate student in 1969 and graduated in economics in 1974. He completed a master's degree in Economics at the University of Turku in 1977. In 1980 Ala-Nissilä passed a HTM auditor's degree and in 1982 he was a certified auditor.

Ala-Nissilä was a member of the constituency of Southwest Finland for a continuous period from 1991 to 2006. He has been a member of parliament in charge of Finance Committee from 1995 to 2006 (2003–2006 chairman) and Parliament Banking Supervisor 1993–2006 and re-appointed in 2015. In 2006, Ala-Nissilä became a member of the European Court of Auditors for a six-year term and Mauri Salo was replaced by his deputy.

Since 2012 Ala-Nissilä has been an international auditing firm BDO's senior advisor. In the 2015 parliamentary elections, he was re-elected as a member of parliament. Ala-Nissilä is Vice Chairman of the Audit Committee.

Between 2001 and 2013, Ala-Nissilä was chairman of the Volleyball SM League and in 2014 became Honorary chairman. Since 2012, he has been an internal inspector of the European Volleyball Association.

References 

1949 births
Centre Party (Finland) politicians
Living people
Members of the Parliament of Finland (1991–95)
Members of the Parliament of Finland (1995–99)
Members of the Parliament of Finland (1999–2003)
Members of the Parliament of Finland (2003–07)
Members of the Parliament of Finland (2015–19)
People from Loimaa
University of Turku alumni